Maben Airport  is a public-use airport located in Prattsville, in Greene County, New York, United States. It is privately owned by Dr. Wayne Maben, M.D. and was founded in 1948 by his father, Robert Maben. It is currently closed indefinitely.

Facilities and aircraft 

For the 12-month period ending August 2, 2002, the airport had 3,650 aircraft operations: 96% general aviation and 4% military. During that period there were 10 aircraft based at this airport, 100% of which were single-engine.

References

External links 

Defunct airports in New York (state)
Airports in New York (state)